Kalachi may refer to:

 Kalachi, Kazakhstan
 An alternative romanisation for Qalaychi, Zanjan

See also
 Baghban Kalachi